Alexander Olsen (5 March 1899 – 4 June 1975) was a Norwegian footballer. He played in 37 matches for the Norway national football team from 1919 to 1932. He was also part of Norway's squad for the football tournament at the 1920 Summer Olympics, but he did not play in any matches.

References

External links
 

1899 births
1975 deaths
Norwegian footballers
Norway international footballers
Association football midfielders
Footballers from Bergen